The First African Missionary Baptist Church in Bainbridge, Georgia, is a Romanesque Revival-style church built during 1904–1909.  It was listed on the National Register of Historic Places in 2002.

It is a brick church.  It was designed by Thomas H. Bynes, a member of the congregation who was a graduate of Tuskegee Institute, and is unusual as an "outstanding example of African-American church architecture in Georgia at the beginning of the 20th century", at a time when most churches founded and built by blacks were usually "plain, one-room frame structures, rectangular in shape with gable roofs" with "little or no ornamentation or architectural detailing."

The interior has 12 curved rows of pews arranged in a semi-circle.

References

Churches on the National Register of Historic Places in Georgia (U.S. state)
Romanesque Revival church buildings in Georgia (U.S. state)
Churches completed in 1904
National Register of Historic Places in Decatur County, Georgia
Baptist churches in Georgia (U.S. state)